Davis Chenault is a game designer who has worked primarily on role-playing games.

Career
Davis Chenault and his brother Stephen Chenault wanted to publish a 300-page leather bound campaign setting. When Stephen learned that Mac Golden was thinking of publishing a gaming magazine called The Seeker, they formed Troll Lord Games with Davis Chenault and published a set of "universal" adventures, and they prepared three of them for Gen Con 33: After Winter's Dark (2000), a 24-page book describing the campaign setting of Erde; The Mortality of Green (2000), an Erde adventure; Vakhund: Into the Unknown (2000), an adventure for the campaign setting of Inzae and also the first part of a trilogy. The Chenaults published their campaign setting, in the Codex of Erde (2001), although it was not quite 200 pages and not leather-bound. Gary Gygax wrote to the Chenaults to thank them for their gift of Troll Lord's first RPG supplements at Gen Con 33, and their conversation eventually led to Gygax offering to write books for Troll Lord. Davis Chenault's Bergholt I: By Shadow of Night (2003) was a companion book intended to kick off a trilogy of adventures set in Inzae but the sequels have never seen print.  When Troll Lord Games published their Castles & Crusades role-playing game, the Chenaults reprinted some of their classics, such as I1: Vakhund: Into the Unknown (2006). When Gary Gygax died in 2008, Troll Lord Games lost the licenses to all of his works, but the Chenaults continue to remember his legacy and his part in the success of their company with a memorial on their main web page.

References

External links
 Davis Chenault :: Pen & Paper RPG Database archive

Living people
Role-playing game designers
Year of birth missing (living people)